O'Hara Glacier is a glacier just west of Ackroyd Point, flowing northwest into the south side of Yule Bay, Victoria Land. Mapped by United States Geological Survey (USGS) from surveys and United States Navy air photos, 1960–63. Named by Advisory Committee on Antarctic Names (US-ACAN) for Norbert W. O'Hara, a member of the United States Antarctic Research Program (USARP) party which conducted studies of the Ross Ice Shelf, 1965–66.

References 

Glaciers of Pennell Coast